Sally Arkley  is a British businesswoman. Arkley is the managing director of the Women's Business Development Agency, Coventry, Warwickshire. In 2008, she was awarded the Queen's Award for Enterprise Promotion. In 2010, she received an MBE.

References

Members of the Order of the British Empire
Queen's Award for Enterprise Promotion (2008)
British businesspeople
Living people
Place of birth missing (living people)
Year of birth missing (living people)
People from Coventry